James Jacob Ritty (29 October 1836 – 29 March 1918), saloonkeeper and inventor, opened his first saloon in Dayton, Ohio in 1871, billing himself as a "Dealer in Pure Whiskies, Fine Wines, and Cigars." Some of Ritty's employees would take the customers' money that was meant to pay for the food, drink, and other wares.  In 1878 while on a steamboat trip to Europe, Ritty became intrigued by a mechanism that counted how many times the ship's propeller went around. He wondered whether something such as this could be made to record the cash transactions made at his saloon.

As soon as he got home to Dayton, Ritty and his brother John, a skilled mechanic, began working on a design for such a device. After several failed prototypes, they created their third design, operated by pressing a key that represented a specific amount of money. There was no cash drawer. James and John Ritty patented the design on November 4, 1879, as "Ritty's Incorruptible Cashier".

The Rittys opened a small factory in Dayton to manufacture cash registers while still operating the saloon. The company did not prosper and in 1881, James Ritty became overwhelmed with the responsibilities of running two businesses, and sold all his interests in the cash register business. The buyers were a group of investors including Jacob H. Eckert of Cincinnati, a china and glassware salesman who formed the National Manufacturing Company, and John and Frank Patterson, who were then in the coal and railroad business.  John H. Patterson became majority owner in 1884, when the company was renamed The National Cash Register Company.

Ritty was not resentful that he did not benefit much from his invention and maintained friendly relations with John H. Patterson and many times was invited to attend various NCR meetings and conferences.

James Ritty opened another saloon, the Pony House, in 1882 in a building on South Jefferson Street that was previously a school of French and English for young ladies. For the Pony House, Ritty commissioned woodcarvers from Barney and Smith Car Company to turn 5,400 pounds of Honduras mahogany into a bar. The initials JR adorn the center peak and the left and right sections are similar to the interior of a passenger railcar, with the giant mirrors set back about a foot with curved, hand-tooled leather-covered elements at the top and curved bezel mirror-encrusted sections on each side. When the Pony House building was torn down in 1967, the bar was saved and today is the bar at Jay's Seafood in Dayton.
 
James Ritty retired from the bar business in 1895.  He died of heart trouble in his downtown Dayton Arcade residence.  He is entombed with his wife Susan and his brother John (ca 1834–28 December 1913) at Dayton's Woodland Cemetery.

References

External links
US Patent #221,360 Cash Register and Indicator
The Pony House Restaurant
 

20th-century American inventors
1836 births
1918 deaths
Businesspeople from Dayton, Ohio
Burials at Woodland Cemetery and Arboretum
Saloonkeepers
NCR Corporation people
19th-century American businesspeople